Aurangabad district (Marathi pronunciation: [əu̯ɾəŋɡaːbaːd̪], Urdu pronunciation:[ɔːɾəŋɡaːbaːd̪]) is one of the 36 districts of the state of Maharashtra in western India. It borders the districts of Nashik to the west, Jalgaon to the north, Jalna to the east, and Ahmednagar to the south. The city of Aurangabad houses the district's administrative headquarters. The district has an area of 10,100 km, of which 37.55% is urban and the rest is rural. Aurangabad District is a major tourism region in Marathwada.

Officer

Members of Parliament

Imtiyaz Jaleel (MIM) 
Raosaheb Danve (BJP)

Guardian Minister

list of Guardian Minister

District Magistrate/Collector

list of District Magistrate / Collector

Geography
Aurangabad District is located mainly in the Godavari River Basin and partly in the Tapti River Basin. The district is located between 19 and 20 degrees north longitude and between 74 and 76 degrees east latitude, covering an area of 10,100 km.

Geology

Geological formations
Aurangabad District lies on the Deccan plateau and is covered by the Deccan Traps, which formed during the Late Cretaceous and Lower Eocene ages. Thin alluvial deposits lie above the Deccan Traps along the major rivers.  The basaltic lava flows belonging to the Deccan Traps are the only major geological formation in the district. The lava flows are horizontal, with each flow featuring two distinct layers. The upper layer consists of vesicular and amygdule zeolitic basalt, while the lower layer consists of massive basalt.

Elevation and mountains
The average height of southern portion of the district is between 600 and 670 metres.  The district features four distinct mountains:
 Antur – 827 m
 Abbasgad – 671 m
 Satonda – 552 m
 Ajintha – 578 m

Rivers
The major rivers in Aurangabad District are the Godavari, Purna, Shivana, and Kham rivers.

The Narangi river rises on the southern slopes of the water divide south of the Maniyad river near the village of Naral.  It flows past Vaijapur, where it is joined by the Deo Nala river from Nasik District. The Narangi follows a long south-southwesterly course before its point of entry into the Godavari. It is joined by the Chor nala from the west and the Kurla nala from the east, continuing the trend of the Kurla river after the Kurla's confluence.

Climate
The rainy season lasts from June through September and the average rainfall is 734 mm.  The temperature ranges from 14 to 40 degrees Celsius on average.  The winter season is from October to February and the summer season is from March to May.

Administrative divisions
The district comprises nine tehsils: Kannad, Soyagaon, Sillod, Phulambri, Aurangabad, Khuldabad, Vaijapur, Gangapur, and Paithan.the new proposal for tehsil is lasur and pishor .
Rhe big towns were divide from gangapur tehsil and kannad tehsil

Nine Maharashtra Vidhan Sabha constituencies are located in this district: Sillod, Kannad, Phulambri, Aurangabad Central, Aurangabad West, Aurangabad East, Paithan, Gangapur, and Vaijapur.

The Vidhan Sabha constituencies are grouped into two Lok Sabha constituencies: Aurangabad and Jalna.

Villages
 

Koli Bodkha

Demographics

It is the 72nd most populous district in India out of 640, and the population growth rate between 2001 and 2011 was 27.33%. The district has a sex ratio of 917 females for every 1000 males and a literacy rate of 80.4%. 43.77% of the population lived in urban areas. Scheduled Castes and Scheduled Tribes made up 14.57% and 3.87% of the population respectively.

Religions 

According to the 2011 census, Hinduism is the most popular religion in the district and is practiced by 69.77% of the population. Other popular religions include Islam (21.25%), Buddhism (8.35%) and Jainism (0.84%).

Languages 

As of the 2011 Census of India, 69.66% of the population in the district speaks Marathi, 14.51% Urdu, 9.49% Hindi and 2.57% Lambadi as their first language.

Transportation

Road
 Mumbai – Aurangabad
 Hyderabad – Aurangabad
 Nagpur – Aurangabad
 Dhule – Aurangabad
 Pune – Aurangabad (approximately 4.5 hours journey time)
 Solapur – Aurangabad

Rail
The Manmad-Kachiguda Railway Station Broad gauge railway line emanates from the Mumbai-Bhusawal-Howrah trunk route at Manmad and is an important traffic artery in Aurangabad District.  Routes include:
 Mumbai – Aurangabad
 Hyderabad – Nanded – Aurangabad
 Secunderabad – Bangalore – Parbhani – Aurangabad
 Delhi – Aurangabad – Delhi
 Nagpur – Aurangabad – Nagpur
 Mumbai-Aurangabad – Mumbai – Janshatabdi Express (daily service)
 Nandigram Express – via – Aurangabad to Mumbai (daily service)
 Devgiri Express – via – Aurangabad to Mumbai (daily service)
 Tapovan Express (AWB to NED)(Nanded) or (AWB to CSTM )(Mumbai)(daily service)
Marathwada Express- (AWB to DAB)()Darmabad) or AWB To MMR(Manmad Jn) (Daily Service) 
Sachkhand Express-  (AWB to NED)(Nanded) or (AWB to ASR) Amritsar JN(Daily Service)

Aurangabad Airport has flights to Delhi, Mumbai, Hyderabad-Tirupati, Ahmedabad, Bengaluru, Udaipur, and Jaipur.

Tourism

There are many points of interest in Aurangabad District, including temples, villages, gardens, and sanctuaries.

Indian rock-cut architecture

Caves
They comprise 30 rock-cut caves around a gorge and were built by the Satavahana, Vakataka and Chalukya dynasties between the 2nd and 5th centuries CE. They contain various works of ancient Indian art, including paintings which are among the rarest and finest surviving examples of their era. The Ajanta Caves are a UNESCO World Heritage Site.
They consist of 34 caves built between the 5th and 10th centuries CE under the patronage of the Rashtrakuta Dynasty. They represent the epitome of Indian rock cut architecture. Like the Ajanta Caves, the Ellora Caves are also a UNESCO World Heritage Site.
Nestled amidst the hills are 12 Buddhist caves dating back to 3 A.D. Of particular interest are the Tantric influences evident in the iconography and architectural design of the caves.

Holy sites

 Grishneshwar Temple is one of the 12 Jyotirlinga shrines in India. It was built by Ahilyabai Holkar in the 18th century CE. The structure is a unique example of Bhoomija architecture with a Maratha style influence.
 Kachner Jain Temple is a 250 year old temple dedicated to Parshvanatha. It contains an idol called Chintamani Parshvanath.
 Shuli Bhanjan is a hill near Aurangabad. It is believed that Saint Eknath Maharaj carried his Tapasya here.

Hindu temples and shrines
Due to the popularity of Hinduism in the region, there are dozens of Hindu temples and shrines.

Grishneshwar temple
Kailash temple, Ellora caves, Verul
Khadakeshwar temple.
Vitthal Mandir, Pandharpur, A'bad.
Renukamata mandir, Karnapura. Karnapura Temple.
Sansthan Ganapati mandir.
Siddhivinayak mandir.
Pavan Ganesh mandir.
Sai Tekadi (Hill).
Hanuman Tekadi (Hill).
Khandoba Mandir, Satara.
Shri Bhadra Maruti Mandir.
Sant Dnyaneshwar Mandir, Paithan.
Eknath Maharaj Mandir, Paithan.
Savata Maharaj Mandir, Vaijapur.
Mahalakshmi Mandir, Vaijapur.
Virbhadra Temple, Vaijapur.
Sant Danshower Maharaj Sansthan.
Mhasoba Maharaj Mandir, Sillod.
Sindhi mandir, Sillod.
Shree Chakradhar Swami Mandir, Gangapur.
Panchavati Mahadev mandir, Gangapur.
Ekmukhi Datt Mandir, Gangapur.
Bhairavnath Mandir, Soegaon.
Munjoba mandir, Soegaon.
Mahamuni Agasti Maharaj Warkari Shikshan Sansthan, Soegaon.
Ram mandir, Kannad.
Bajarangbali mandir, Kannad.
Jagrut Siddhivinayak temple, Kannad.

Gates and forts

The city of Aurangabad is known for its 52 gates and has been called the "City of Gates".  These gates were built during Mughal era.

It was one of the most powerful forts during the medieval era. The fort was built on a  conical hill and defended by moats, trenches, and three encircling walls with bastions. It also had two fixed massive canons which could be pivoted. The fort was never conquered by any military force.

Mughal architecture

 The Bibi Ka Maqbara is the burial mausoleum of Emperor Aurangzeb's wife, Dilras Banu Begum (posthumously known as Rabia-ud-Daurani). It is an imitation of the Taj Mahal at Agra and is popularly known as the "Taj of the Deccan".
 The Tomb of Aurangzeb is located in the village of Khuldabad,  to the north-west of Aurangabad city, in the south-eastern corner of the complex of the dargah of Sheikh Zainuddin.  Aurangzeb is considered to have been last great Mughal emperor.

Other notable sites

Panchakki, which literally means "water mill", is a 17th-century water mill situated within the old city of Aurangabad.  It is known for its underground channel, which carries water from hills over 8 km away. The channel culminates in an artificial waterfall that powers the mill.
 Salim Ali Lake & Bird Sanctuary is located in the northern part of the city near Delhi Darwaza, opposite Himayat Bagh. During the Mughal period, it was known as Khiziri Talab. It was renamed after the great ornithologist and naturalist Salim Ali. It features a bird sanctuary and a garden maintained by the Aurangabad Municipal Corporation.
 Siddharth Garden and Zoo is situated near the central bus station in Aurangabad city. It is the only zoo in the Marathwada region. It is home to several species of animals, birds, flowers, and trees. The name "Siddhartha" is a reference to Gautama Buddha.

See also 
 Tourism in Marathwada
 Aurangabad Industrial City

References

External links

 

 
Districts of Maharashtra
Aurangabad division
Marathwada